Tyler Media Group, also known as Tyler Broadcasting Corporation or simply Tyler Media, is a family-owned Oklahoma business with Radio, TV and outdoor advertising assets in Tulsa and Oklahoma City. Tyler Media owns five television stations (consisting of two Univision network affiliates, one Estrella TV affiliate and two Telemundo affiliates) and thirteen radio stations (nine English-language and four Spanish-language). The company also operates an outdoor advertising company, Tyler Outdoor Advertising, and Tyler Media Digital, Tyler Media's newest marketing extension. The company is headquartered at 5101 South Shields Boulevard in Oklahoma City.

History
The company was founded in 1965 by Ralph Tyler, when it purchased KEBC radio in Oklahoma City; Tyler owned the station for 14 years until 1986. Tyler re-entered the radio business in 1994 with the purchase of a station in Ada. Tyler Media entered the television industry in 2004 after it purchased Oklahoma City television station KQOK (channel 30). After the sale, Tyler Media converted the station into a Telemundo affiliate and recalled the station to KTUZ-TV after its new radio sister.

On April 16, 2009, Tyler purchased five affiliates of the Spanish-language network Univisión at an auction held by Equity Media Holdings, which was liquidating its assets that year due to bankruptcy. After the sale was approved by the FCC, this created a duopoly with KTUZ-TV. Equity had owned both stations at some point, KTUZ-TV was owned by Equity from sign-on until 2004 when Equity traded channel 30 to Tyler Media in exchange for KUOK.

On July 15, 2012, Tyler Media entered into an agreement with Renda Broadcasting to purchase that company's Oklahoma City radio cluster (KMGL, KOMA, KRXO and KOKC) for $40 million. In accordance to limits imposed by the Federal Communications Commission on the number of radio stations a single broadcasting entity can own in a single market, Tyler sold KTLR-AM/FM and KKNG to WPA Radio for $1.6 million.

In early 2017, Tyler Media launched its newest marketing extension called, Tyler Media Digital.

Stations

Television

Current

Former

Radio

Translators

References

External links
Official website

Television broadcasting companies of the United States
Radio broadcasting companies of the United States
Companies based in Oklahoma City